Richard Badew (died 1361) was a Vice Chancellor and Chancellor of the University of Cambridge in the 14th century. He was responsible for the foundation of University Hall, Cambridge (now Clare College) in 1326.

References
 A.B. Cobban, 2004, 'Badew, Richard (d. 1361)', Oxford Dictionary of National Biography. Oxford: Oxford University Press.

14th-century births
1361 deaths
Chancellors of the University of Cambridge
Founders of English schools and colleges

Year of birth unknown